Sandycove Island (Cnoc an Rois in Irish) is a small island and townland at the mouth of Ardkilly Creek on the south coast of Ireland, just to the west of the Castlepark peninsula, which forms the western side of the entrance to Kinsale harbour in County Cork.

The island is uninhabited except for a herd of feral goats which has grazed on the island for generations, an indication that there is probably a reliable source of fresh water on the island.

Over the centuries a number of ships have foundered on the rocks off the island, including the 147-ton brig Eliza which went aground on the island in 1826.

The Sandycove Island Challenge is an open-water swimming race. It has been held annually  since 1994.
The course is from the slipway at Sandycove on the mainland, around Sandycove Island and back to the slipway. The total distance is approximately 1,600m. If sea conditions are unsuitable on the day, a more sheltered course is followed.

References 

Islands of County Cork